De la Mora is a surname. "De la," in several Romance languages (including Spanish and Romanian), means "from." "Mora," in Spanish, translates to "mulberry."

Etymology  
"Mora" might denote places in the Spanish provinces of Albacete, León, Navarre, Toledo (town of Mora), or Mexican province of Guanajuato (town of Doctor Mora).

"Mora" might represent a toponymic surname for a family who lives or lived where mulberries grow or grew.

"Mora," might be part of an ethnic phrase that means "the Moorish woman's son," from mora "(female) Moor."

Similar surnames: Del Moral, Lamora, Delamar, De Moura, De La Torre, Della Porta.

People with the surname

Fine arts and performing arts 
 Alexandra de la Mora (born 1980), Mexican actress
 Antonio de la Mora (1884–1926), Mexican musician who served as bandmaster in the military bands of 3 countries
 Brittni de La Mora (born 1987), American pornographic actress
 Enrique de la Mora (1907–1978), Mexican architect
 Fernando de la Mora (tenor) (born 1958), Mexican operatic tenor
 Guillermo Schmidhuber de la Mora (born 1943), Mexican author, playwright, and critic

Politics, military, and other public services 
 Fernando de la Mora (politician) (1773–1835), Paraguayan statesman
 Francisco de la Mora y Ceballos  Spanish military officer, merchant, and Governor of colonial New Mexico between March 1632 and 1635
 Gonzalo Fernández de la Mora (1924–2002), Spanish essayist and politician
 Itzel Ríos de la Mora (born 1978), Mexican politician
 Ximena Puente de la Mora (born 1977), Mexican lawyer, academic, researcher, and politician

Religion 
 Georgina de la Mora, American megachurch pastor, wife of Sergio
 Sergio José de la Mora (born 1966), American megachurch pastor, husband of Georgina

Sports 
 David de la Mora (born 1989), Mexican boxer
 Marco Fabián de la Mora (born 1989), Mexican soccer player

Fictional characters with the surname
 The central family of Mexican television show The House of Flowers, including Paulina de la Mora

See also 
 De Mora
 Mora (disambiguation)

References 

Surnames of Spanish origin
Toponymic surnames